is a rural district located in Yamagata Prefecture, Japan.
As of October 2013, the district has an estimated population of 7,652 and an area of 79.59 km2. The cities of Murayama, Higashine and Ozanazawa and a portion of the city of Tendō were formerly part of Kitamurayama District.

Towns and villages
Ōishida

History
Murayama County was an ancient place name in part of Dewa Province, occupying the area of modern Mogami, Nishimurayama, Higashimurayama and Kitamurayama districts. Under the Tokugawa shogunate, the area Kitamurayama district was a complicated mosaic. Two towns and 48 villages were tenryo ruled directly by the Tokugawa shogunate, 32 villages were part of Matsumae Domain in Ezo,  13 villages were part of Shinjō Domain, 7 villages were under Tsuchiura Domain, 4 villages were under Nagatoro Domain, 2 villages were part of Tendō Domain, 2 villages were part of Tatebayashi Domain and 1 village was part of Sakura Domain
The area became part of Yamagata Prefecture in 1876. At that time, Kitamurayama District consisted of 2 towns and 105 villages. 
 

With the establishment of the municipality system on April 1, 1889, the district was consolidated into 23 villages. 
 On March 18, 1892 Tateoka was raised to town status 
 On June 15, 1896 Higashine was raised to town status
 On April 22, 1897 Ōishida was raised to town status
 On July 16, 1897 Obanazawa was raised to town status
 On November 1, 1954 the city of Murayama was founded by the merger of Tateoka with five neighboring villages.
 On November 3, 1958 Higashine was raised to city status
 On April 10, 1959 Obanazawa was raised to city status
 

Districts in Yamagata Prefecture